Lambton Collieries was a privately owned colliery and coal mining company, based in County Durham, England.

History
The name derives from Lambton Castle, the ancestral family home of the Lambton family.

With coal having been extracted in the area from the 1600s, the commercial extraction of coal was developed by John Lambton in the lands surrounding the castle through the Wear Valley. The first of seven pits was sunk in the village of Bournmoor from 1783 onwards, which together were to make up what was known as Lambton Colliery.

The company was first formed when Lambton's grandson, John Lambton the first Earl of Durham, entered Parliament as a Whig politician. The formal name change to Lambton Collieries was adopted in 1896.

In 1910 the company merged with Hetton Collieries to form Lambton & Hetton Collieries. In 1924, that company merged with Joicey Collieries to form Lambton, Hetton & Joicey Collieries.

In 1947, along with all of the other private coal companies of the United Kingdom, it was nationalised under the Coal Industry Nationalisation Act 1946 to form the National Coal Board.

Lambton Railway

To enable the coal extracted from the collieries to be transported to the River Wear, from 1737 the company had constructed a horse-drawn tramway from Fatfield to Cox Green. In 1819 the Lambton's bought the Newbottle wagonway, and connected this to the Lambton Railway with a line between Bournmoor and Philadelphia. This now meant that the company had a direct route from its collieries to the River Wear, where it constructed Lambton Staithes within the Port of Sunderland.

The company went steam powered from 1814, initially with a series of 0-6-0T locomotives. Still mainly rope-incline worked and developed from original horse-drawn tramways, in the next 20 years it was reengineered to be mainly steam locomotive powered.

In 1854 the North Eastern Railway was formed, which gave it control of the mainline from Darlington to Newcastle via the Leamside Line. This resulted in the company buying a new series of 0-6-0 tender locomotives to power these heavier mainline trains.

After Lambton Collieries merged with Hetton Collieries in 1911, the company gained control over the Hetton Railway, which was surveyed and laidout by George Stephenson from 1822 primarily for the use of steam locomotives. This was still mainly a rope-incline railway, which was made redundant through access to the Lambton Railway. The company did however additionally connect Lambton staithes to the Hetton staithes within the docks.

In 1924 after the merger with Joicey Collieries, the company gained control of the Beamish Railway, although this remained a separate operation.

In 1959 the Hetton Railway via Warden Law was closed. A further spate of closures occurred in 1967 with Lambton Staithes being closed in January and the line to Pallion closing in August of the same year.

Collieries

References

External links
Lambton Collieries at the Durham Mining Museum
Lambton Locomotives Trust

Non-renewable resource companies established in 1820
Non-renewable resource companies disestablished in 1947
Companies based in County Durham
Coal companies of England
Private companies limited by guarantee of England
Defunct mining companies of the United Kingdom
History of County Durham
Mining in County Durham
Defunct companies of England
Energy companies established in 1820
Energy companies disestablished in 1947
1820 establishments in England
1947 disestablishments in England
British companies disestablished in 1947
British companies established in 1820
Defunct energy companies of the United Kingdom